Aleksandr Selevko (born 23 May 2001) is an Estonian figure skater. He is the 2017 Egna Spring Trophy bronze medalist, the 2019 Nordics bronze medalist, and a three-time Estonian national champion (2020–22). He has competed in the final segment at five ISU Championships – two World Junior Championships (2016, 2020), two European Championships (2019, 2020) and once at World Figure Skating Championships (2021). He is the older brother of Mihhail Selevko, who also represents Estonia internationally in figure skating.

Career 
At the 2021 World Championships, Selevko placed 24th in the short program, 15th in the free skate, and 16th overall. As a result of his placement, Estonia earned an Olympic spot in men's singles.

Selevko was nominated to represent Estonia at the 2022 Winter Olympics. He dislocated his shoulder in training a couple of days before the short program of the men's event. He managed to compete but finished twenty-eighth in the segment and did not advance to the free skate.

Programs

Competitive highlights 
GP: Grand Prix; CS: Challenger Series; JGP: Junior Grand Prix

References

External links 
 
 
 

2001 births
Estonian male single skaters
Living people
Figure skaters from Tallinn
Figure skaters at the 2022 Winter Olympics
Olympic figure skaters of Estonia
Estonian people of Ukrainian descent